Matt Rider, also known by the pseudonym Zalmah, is a former professional electronic sports player and commentator.

Rider became European Champion of World of Warcraft at Blizzcon 2007 with 'Per 'Lykke' Nielsen'. He was signed by Championship Gaming Series (CGS) when DirectTV planned to broadcast World of Warcraft to a mainstream television audience. He placed second at the 2v2 World Finals at Sony Studios, Los Angeles and qualified for 5v5 European finals in Hamburg.
 
In 2008 he relocated to Cologne, Germany to work for Electronic Sports League as host and editor with James "2GD" Harding and Joe Miller (commentator). Broadcasting the Intel Extreme Masters, he provided commentary for World of Warcraft and Counter-Strike 1.6 tournaments, presenting live at CeBit and Gamescom.

In 2009 he produced the weekly internet World of Warcraft show WoW Wednesdays which attracted a regular viewership before the emergence of streaming platforms like Twitch.

In 2011 over 1.5 million unique viewers watched him present the esports finals live at DreamHack, the world's largest digital festival and lan party.

In 2018 Rider founded Play Context, an independent publishing label for entertainment.

References
 ^ "Dell 2v2 Finals" webcast at www.delllounge.com from Anaheim, California, August 3, 2007
 ^ "CGS World Finals", webcast at thecgs.com from Sony Studios, Los Angeles, December 8, 2007
 ^ "European Champion Interviewed", SK Gaming, December 18, 2007
 ^ "Three new well known British hosts at ESL TV", ESL World, October 1, 2008
 ^ "Games, Geld und Politik, Neues Deutschland, April 26, 2017

External links 
 Play Context: https://PlayContext.com
 Website: https://ZALMAH.com
 Twitter: https://twitter.com/RiderMatt

Living people
Game players from London
1988 births
Esports commentators
World of Warcraft players
English esports players